James Bradley Simons (May 15, 1950 – December 8, 2005) was an American professional golfer who played on the PGA Tour in the 1970s and 1980s.

Born in Pittsburgh, and raised in suburban Butler, Pennsylvania, Simons attended Knoch High School in Saxonburg and later was a two-time All-American on the Wake Forest University golf team. He finished T-2 at the 1970 Canadian Amateur and finished runner-up at the 1971 British Amateur to Steve Melnyk.

Simons is probably best remembered for nearly winning the U.S. Open in 1971 as an amateur. At the age of 21, he shot a third-round 65 to take a two-shot lead after 54 holes at Merion Golf Club near Philadelphia. That set up the possibility of Simons becoming the first amateur to win the event since Johnny Goodman in 1933. A stroke out of the lead on the final hole, his tee shot found the rough and he double bogeyed. Simons carded a 76 to finish tied for fifth, three shots out of the Monday playoff, won by Lee Trevino.

Four years earlier, Simons had qualified for the U.S. Open in 1967 at Baltusrol, played just after his junior year in high school. At age 17, he shot 165 (+25) and missed the 36-hole cut by 17 strokes.

Simons won three PGA Tour events during his career and had over three dozen top-10 finishes; his final win came at Pebble Beach in early 1982. His best finish in a major championship in the professional ranks was later that year, a tie for fifth in the PGA Championship. He was the first player to win a televised PGA Tour event using a metal driver. Simons also notably worked as an investment executive while golfing professionally. 

Simons played a handful of events on the Champions Tour after turning 50 in 2000. He was inducted into the Wake Forest University Athletics Hall of Fame in 1996.

Death
Simons was found dead in the hot tub in his Jacksonville, Florida home at the age of 55. The Jacksonville/Duval County medical examiner's office ruled the cause of death as accidental "multiple drug toxicity".

Amateur wins
1966 West Penn Junior Championship
1969 West Penn Amateur, Pennsylvania Amateur, Western Junior
1970 Pennsylvania Amateur

Professional wins (3)

PGA Tour wins (3)

PGA Tour playoff record (0–3)

Results in major championships

Note: Simons never played in The Open Championship.

LA = Low amateur
CUT = missed the half-way cut
"T" indicates a tie for a place

U.S. national team appearances
Amateur
Walker Cup: 1971

See also 

 1972 PGA Tour Qualifying School graduates

References

External links

American male golfers
Wake Forest Demon Deacons men's golfers
PGA Tour golfers
Golfers from Pittsburgh
Golfers from Jacksonville, Florida
People from Butler, Pennsylvania
Drug-related deaths in Florida
1950 births
2005 deaths